Bangkok Traffic (Love) Story is a Thai romantic comedy film released by GTH on 15 October 2009. It was directed by Adisorn Tresirikasem and written by Navapol Thamrongruttanarit. The film tells the story of Mei Li (Cris Horwang), a thirty-year-old woman feeling desperate about being last among her friends to marry, and her relationship with Loong (Theeradej Wongpuapan), an engineer working on the BTS Skytrain system. The skytrain, which celebrated its tenth anniversary the same year and lends its name to the film's Thai and English titles, is prominently featured throughout the story.

The film was criticized for its loose plot, but critics felt that young middle-class female Bangkokians could identify with the contemporary setting. The film was financially successful, earning 57 million baht on its opening weekend and over 140 million baht after four weeks.

Plot
Thirty-year-old Mei Li (Cris Horwang) has never had a boyfriend. She gets drunk on her best friend Ped's (Panisara Pimpru) wedding night, upset that she is the only single girl left in her friend group. Driving home intoxicated, she crashes her car but is aided by an attractive man. When she reaches home, her family scolds her and bans her from driving, forcing her to commute by public transport.

The next night, Li accidentally catches their teenage maid having sex with her boyfriend on their rooftop. Li's father demands to see the boy's guardian, who turns out to be the man who helped Li the previous night. The man, Loong (Theeradej Wongpuapan), is a tenant at the guest house the boy caretakes. On another night, Li encounters Loong on the BTS Skytrain, where she accidentally breaks his sunglasses. She buys Loong a new pair of sunglasses and writes her phone number on the box, hoping he would call her. After waiting in vain, Li and her neighbor Plern (Ungsumalynn Sirapatsakmetha) meet Loong at the video rental shop he frequents, and the flirtatious Plern cleverly obtains Loong's phone number and learns that he is a night shift engineer for the BTS Skytrain. However, Plern refuses to give Loong's number to Li, and instead becomes a cashier at the video rental store. In retaliation, Li summons Plern's three boyfriends to the store, causing a ruckus that Loong gets caught in resulting in the smashing of his laptop.

Feeling responsible, Li take Loong's laptop to Ped's husband, but he can't fix it. Li goes to return it at the BTS office. When Loong finishes work, he finds Li, and they ride the BTS to get home. Loong decides to throw away the laptop and its bag. Li picks the bag up out of the garbage bin and takes it home. There are many things inside, including film negatives. Li has the film printed, and finds there are pictures of Loong with Kob Kavita (Taksaorn Paksukjareon), an actress in "Saint's Tear", a popular television series. The photo printing shop owner posts the pictures on the internet, as they are of a famous actress.

Li meets Loong again on a skytrain, and tells him that the pictures might have been published because of her, but Loong doesn't mind. Loong tells her that Kob is his ex-girlfriend, and they broke up because their time schedules didn't match. When the skytrain arrives at Ekkamai Station, Li suggests that they watch the stars at the Bangkok Planetarium and see an exhibition about a comet that will be appearing soon. Li asks Loong to watch the comet with her in Bangkok. Later, before the Songkran holidays, Loong asks Li to come celebrate by throwing water.

During the Songkran festival, Plern joins them. Li doesn't enjoy the festivities because of her. Li knows Loong's address, which is a guesthouse next to Chao Phraya River. Li changes her clothes and goes to see Loong, and finds him asleep. Li falls asleep next to him. After she wakes up, Loong asks her to travel around Bangkok. Loong asks Li to come to family day at the BTS, as he can take her into the depot. Loong takes pictures, but Li damages the camera.

On the family day visit, Li finds out that Loong is leaving in two days time to spend two years studying in Germany. They say goodbye on the Taksin Bridge. Loong sends Li a box when he arrives in Germany. Inside is the mirror from her car from when they first met, the damaged sunglasses, the broken laptop, Bangkok Planetarium tickets, and the damaged camera, with the memory card still inside. Li looks at the pictures. She rushes to Suvarnabhumi Airport to try to stop Loong, but she is too late. On that day, the comet orbits to the earth. Loong watches the comet from on board his plane, while Li watches it as well.

Two years later, while going to work one evening, Li accidentally meets Loong on a BTS Skytrain. Loong works a day shift and has been back in Thailand for a few months. Both get off the Skytrain at Siam Station, which is the interchange station between the Sukhumvit Line and the Silom Line. Li goes downstairs to change to a different line and doesn't turn back to look at Loong. Li gets on her train, but the electricity goes out. Passengers call their friends or family to say the train has stopped. Li's phone rings; it is Loong. He asks Li to again celebrate Songkran. Li replies that she is free for the holidays. When electricity comes back on, Loong is on the same Skytrain, standing next to Li. He tells Li that she has his number now, and to save it.

Production
Bangkok Traffic (Love) Story was sponsored by the BTS, and the movie includes many scenes depicting maintenance work on the system and its infrastructure. The film was promoted as part of BTS's tenth anniversary celebrations. The film's Thai name, Rod fai fah.. Ma Ha Na Ther, translates as "Skytrain, coming to meet you", and is a word play on Rot Fai Fa Maha Nakhon, which is the Thai name of the MRT underground system. The English title is abbreviated BTS to coincide with that of the skytrain system.

The film was filmed in many places in Bangkok, including Wat Arun, Yaowarat, Ananta Samakhom Throne Hall, Bangkok Planetarium, Chan Road.

Loong's guesthouse filmed at Loy La Long Hotel, a guesthouse in the Talat Noi area along the Chao Phraya River that can see the pagoda of Chee Chin Khor Temple in Khlong San side clearly.

Reception

Critical response
Critics mostly noted how Bangkok Traffic (Love) Story, despite its flaws, appropriately served and satisfied its target audience of Bangkok's young female adults. In Manager Daily, Aphinan Bunrueangphanao noted the film's chick flick elements, and how the casting of Theeradej as the male lead helped boosted the film's appeal. He noted that Cris skillfully represented the humorously exaggerated single urban female in her lead role, but criticized the film for its weak and loose plot. Nantakwang Sirasoontorn observed in Kom Chad Luek that the film's most distinct theme was that of the female fantasy of meeting the perfect man. He noted that images of contemporary Bangkok life and GTH's carefully planned marketing campaigns helped propel the film to success. He commended Cris's acting and criticized the weak plot.

Box office
Bangkok Traffic (Love)Story was a box office hit upon release, earning 15.1 million baht on its opening day, surpassing Phobia 2s prior annual record of 14.9 million, and 57 million baht during the opening weekend. At four weeks, the film totalled over 140 million baht in theatrical earnings, surpassing Fan Chan's prior GTH record of 137 million, and becoming by far the highest-grossing film of 2009.

Awards

References

External links
 

2009 films
GMM Tai Hub films
Films shot in Bangkok
Films set in Bangkok
Thai romantic comedy films
Rail transport films
2009 comedy films